Rosalind Savage MBE FRGS (born 23 December 1967) is an English ocean rower, environmental advocate, writer and speaker.

She holds four Guinness World Records for ocean rowing, including first woman to row solo across three oceans: the Atlantic, Pacific and Indian. She has rowed over 15,000 miles, taken around 5 million oarstrokes, and spent cumulatively over 500 days of her life at sea in a 23-foot rowboat. She was awarded the MBE (Member of the Order of the British Empire) in the Queen's Birthday Honours 2013 for services to environmental awareness and fundraising. She was awarded an honorary degree (Doctor of Laws) from Bristol University in 2014.

Roz Savage is a United Nations Climate Hero, a trained presenter for the Climate Reality Project, and an Athlete Ambassador for 350.org. She is on the board of Adventurers and Scientists for Conservation, and a Blue Ambassador for the UK-based BLUE Project. She promotes plastic-free communities as co-patron of the Greener Upon Thames campaign for a plastic bag free Olympics in 2012, and as a Notable Coalition Member of the Plastic Pollution Coalition. She also supports the work of the 5 Gyres Institute, and is an Ambassador for Plastic Oceans and MacGillivray Freeman's One World One Ocean project. Her voyages take place under the auspices of the Blue Frontier Campaign.

She is also a Fellow of the Royal Geographical Society, a Fellow of the Explorers Club of New York, and has been listed amongst the Top Twenty Great British Adventurers by the Daily Telegraph and the Top Ten Ultimate Adventurers by National Geographic. In 2011, she received the Ocean Inspiration Through Adventure award. She has been inducted into the International Green Industry Hall of Fame and was a recipient of a Yale World Fellowship. In 2010, she was named Adventurer of the Year by National Geographic.

Background
Savage was born in Cheshire. She took up rowing at University College, Oxford, and went on to gain two half-blues for representing Oxford against Cambridge, and to win blades with the Univ Women's 1st VIII in 1988 and 1989.

By 2000, at age 34, she had spent 11 years as a management consultant. On a train trip that year, however, she sketched obituaries for the life she was living and the one she really wanted. Their disparity spurred her to give up her husband, steady income and big house in the suburbs.

In 2003, she became a Fellow of the Royal Geographical Society and took part in an Anglo-American expedition that discovered Inca ruins in the Andean cloudforests near Machu Picchu.   She then spent an additional three months in Peru, travelling solo and researching her first book, Three Peaks in Peru.

She ran in the London and New York marathons, finishing in the top 2% of women in each, and has run a personal best of 3 hours 19 minutes.

Her story was filmed as A Little Silver Boat in a Big Silver Sea as part of the ITV1 documentary television series Is It Worth It?, first broadcast on Monday, 12 March 2007 in the UK.

Ocean rows

The Atlantic
On 14 March 2006, she completed the first leg by finishing the Atlantic Rowing Race as the only solo female competitor, taking 103 days to complete the crossing.  This she did unsupported, despite breaking all four of her oars and having to row with patched-up oars for more than half the race.  Her cooking stove failed after only 20 days, then her navigation equipment and music player.  She managed to maintain her daily weblog right up until day 80 when her satellite phone failed, leaving only the movement detected by her positional transponder.

Despite all this, and the danger of having to cut off the rope to her failed sea anchor in  waves, she arrived safely at the finish in Antigua. She is only the 5th woman to row solo across the Atlantic from East to West.

Savage's book of her Atlantic voyage Rowing the Atlantic – Lessons Learned on the Open Ocean was published on 6 October 2009 by Simon & Schuster.

The Pacific
Shortly after her successful Atlantic crossing, she announced her bid to become the first woman to row solo across the Pacific Ocean from the US to Australia.  (Maud Fontenoy rowed solo halfway across the Pacific in 2005, via a different route.) After successfully completing 3 stages, starting from California in Summer 2008, and breaking her journey in Hawaii to Tuvalu in 2009 to Papua New Guinea in 2010, Savage accomplished her goal.

She began stage one on 12 August 2007 from Crescent City, California, and was rescued 10 days later approximately 90 miles offshore by the U.S. Coast Guard when a well-wisher called them out after becoming concerned when she mentioned heavy weather and a head injury in her blog. She was later able to recover her boat "Brocade". She made another attempt on 25 May 2008 launching from Sausalito, California and arrived in Hawaii on 1 September 2008, becoming the first woman to row solo from California to Hawaii. She completed the crossing from San Francisco to Waikiki in a time of 99 days 8 hours and 55 minutes. En route to Hawaii, Savage was given an essential resupply of water by the two-man crew of the JUNK raft, also on a journey from California to Hawaii. They were running low on food as their voyage was taking longer than expected, and she was able to donate them some of her surplus.

She began stage two on 24 May 2009, with intentions to arrive at the island nation of Tuvalu 2580 miles away.
On 28 August, after suffering adverse winds and currents for several days, with food supplies running low and her water-maker broken, Savage realised that she was unlikely to be able to reach Tuvalu and reluctantly changed course for Tarawa. She arrived in Tarawa on 5 September after 104 days at sea and approximately 1.3 million oar strokes.

Savage began her third and final stage for the Pacific Row on 18 April 2010 with the intention to row to the eastern shore of Australia. After mid ocean currents gave her a more westerly course, she again changed her destination and arrived at Papua New Guinea on 8 May 2010. She reported by Twitter on 3, 1 June:35pm (UTC) that she arrived at Madang, Papua New Guinea after 45 days at sea.

The Indian
In April 2011, Savage set out to row across the Indian Ocean, launching from Fremantle, Australia. Her route, daily locations and destination were kept secret because of the danger from pirates.
She was towed back to Australia a fortnight into the 4000 mile voyage due to a fault with the desalination machine the rowing boat was equipped with.
Savage successfully completed her Indian Ocean crossing on 4 October 2011, becoming the first woman to solo row the "Big Three," the Atlantic, Pacific and Indian Oceans. The crossing took 154 days.

North Atlantic
In March 2012, Savage announced that she would row that North Atlantic as part of the Olympic Atlantic Row (OAR) team with Andrew Morris. The goal was to row from St John's in Canada to the UK, making landfall in Bristol and then rowing through the inland waterways to London, arriving in time for the Olympics. This row was postponed indefinitely in May 2012 due to unusually large numbers of icebergs drifting past the coast of Newfoundland, the result of a huge chunk of ice breaking off a glacier in Greenland in 2010. The situation was deemed to represent an unacceptable level of risk to the safety of the rowers.

Ocean Rowing Race Support
In 2012, Savage joined Chris Martin (rower) and the team at New Ocean Wave as Race Consultant to the Great Pacific Race from Monterey, California to Honolulu, Hawaii starting in June 2014.

References

Further reading
BBC News, Tuesday, 14 March 2006
Merco Press, Thursday 16 February 2006
Financial Times FT.comk, 19 November 2005
BBC Radio 4 Interview, 12 April 2006
TheOcean.net 14 March 2006
Yorkshire Post Today, 28 June 2006
 The Daily Telegraph
Radio interview on WNYC for "Rowing the Atlantic" 6 October 2009

External links
Official Website
Roz Rows The Pacific
Roz Savage YouTube Channel
Solo woman rows the Atlantic: Part 1
Solo woman rows the Atlantic: Part 2
Solo woman rows the Atlantic: Part 3
Solo woman rows the Atlantic: Part 4

British female rowers
English female rowers
Ocean rowers
Fellows of the Royal Geographical Society
Alumni of University College, Oxford
1967 births
Living people